American rapper Ski Mask the Slump God has released one studio album, four mixtapes, five collaborative mixtapes, four extended plays and 17 singles (including seven as a featured artist). Ski Mask's debut studio album, Stokeley, was released on November 30, 2018 through Republic Records and peaked on the US Billboard 200 chart at number six.

Albums

Studio albums

Mixtapes

Collaborative mixtapes and album

Extended plays

Singles

As lead artist

As featured artist

Other charted songs

Notes

References

Discographies of American artists
Hip hop discographies